The 2009 Trofeo Paolo Corazzi was a professional tennis tournament played on outdoor hard courts. It was part of the 2009 ATP Challenger Tour. It took place in Cremona, Italy between May 18 and May 24, 2009.

Singles entrants

Seeds

Rankings are as of May 11, 2009.

Other entrants
The following players received wildcards into the singles main draw:
  Mauro Bosio
  Daniele Bracciali
  Laurynas Grigelis
  Giuseppe Menga

The following players received special exempt into the singles main draw:
  Leonardo Tavares

The following players received entry from the qualifying draw:
  Grigor Dimitrov
  Stefano Galvani
  Peter Gojowczyk
  Noam Okun

Champions

Singles

 Benjamin Becker def.  Izak van der Merwe, 7–6(3), 6–1

Doubles

 Colin Fleming /  Ken Skupski def.  Daniele Bracciali /  Alessandro Motti, 6–2, 6–1

References
Official website
ITF search 

Trofeo Paolo Corazzi
Trofeo Paolo Corazzi